Japanese competition law consists of the , officially the , and several other statutory laws.

The AMA was introduced during the postwar United States-led-and-controlled Allied occupation. President Harry S. Truman, on 6 September 1945, issued a presidential directive instructing the Supreme Commander for the Allied Powers (SCAP) to dissolve Zaibatsu structures. Prior to World War II, Japan had no antitrust laws. There were seventeen Zaibatsu organisations, the four largest of which had controlled approximately a fourth of all of the paid-up capital in the Japanese economy just prior to the World War.

In opposition to General MacArthur's fear that Zaibatsu dissolution would lead to instability, the U.S. Departments of State and Justice sent a "Special Mission on Japanese Combines" to Japan for the implementation of a comprehensive antimonopoly framework. In response, MacArthur coerced the Japanese Diet into adopting legislation known as the Antimonopoly Act (AMA), with the persuasion to them that enforcement was optional.

Antimonopoly Act
MacArthur's AMA, which is still Japan's fundamental competition law, generalised prohibitions against three types of anticompetitive conduct.
private monopolization
unreasonable restraints of trade and
unfair methods of competition.

The AMA led to the formation of Japan's Fair Trade Commission (JFTC).

Relaxation of the Act
The weakness of the AMA was due to vagueness requiring JFTC officials to be familiar with presumptions built into American antitrust laws. Seeing the need for stability and the growing threat of Communism, the United States backtracked on requiring Japan's enforcement of the AMA and instead encouraged the resurrection of Zaibatsu structures.

Japan, which had grown increasingly independent of the United States in the 1950s, succumbed to pressures from Japanese business and need for recovery from economic depression due to the end of the Korean War. The SCAP and the U.S. Government acquiesced to Prime Minister Yoshida's actions to enact relaxations to the AMA when occupation of Japan ended with the implementation of the San Francisco Peace Treaty on 28 April 1952. All cartels illegal under the original AMA were effectively legalized.

Strengthening of the Act
Amendments were made to strengthen the AMA in the 1970s due to, in part, pressures from American businesses. The 1973 oil crisis and price fixing by Japanese oil companies further garnered public opinion in Japan against the weakness of the AMA and its lack of enforcement. The new articles introduced authorised the JFTC to dissolve or divest a company based on barriers against market-entry, lack of price benefit for consumers and unreasonable profits. The JFTC was authorised to impose fines for violations of the AMA.

Cartels still exist

However, the existence of cartels known as keiretsu are still legalized with the following notes.
Cartels calculate penalties beforehand and include such penalties as costs of business.
Penalty calculations, which do not correlate with profits, present insufficient financial disincentives for businesses to collude.
Courts in Japan lack contempt powers to ensure compliance with the JFTC's cease and desist orders.

See also
Law of Japan

References

Fry, James D. "Struggling to teethe: Japan's antitrust enforcement regime," in Law and Policy in International Business, Summer 2001

Japanese business law
Competition law by country